Titanochelon is an extinct genus of giant tortoises known from the Early Miocene to the beginning of the Pleistocene in Europe, extending from the Iberian Peninsula to Anatolia.

Taxonomy 
There are approximately 10 known species in the genus, most of which were originally assigned to Testudo (a genus which formally encompassed almost all fossil tortoises) or Cheirogaster, the type species of which, Cheirogaster maurini is known from the Eocene of France and is quite different to the species assigned to Titanochelon. After a major systematic revision in 2014, the genus Titanochelon was created to house these related species.

 Titanochelon bolivari  (Hernandez-Pacheco, 1917)  (type) Iberian Peninsula, Miocene
 Titanochelon bacharidisi  (Vlachos et al., 2014)  Greece, Bulgaria, Late Miocene
 Titanochelon perpiniana  (Deperet 1885)  France, Pliocene
Titanochelon schafferi  (Szalai, 1931)  Samos, Greece, Miocene
Titanochelon vitodurana (Biedermann 1862)  Switzerland, Early Miocene
Titanochelon kayadibiensis  Karl, Staesche & Safi, 2021, Anatolia, Miocene
Titanochelon eurysternum  (Gervais, 1848–1852)  France, Miocene
Titanochelon ginsburgi  (de Broin, 1977 ) France, Miocene
Titanochelon leberonensis (Depéret, 1890)  France, Miocene

The species "Testudo" gymnesica Bate, 1914 from the Lower Pliocene-Lower Pleistocene of the Balearic Islands was formerly suggested to be possibly attributable to this genus, but the taxon displays notable differences from the species assigned to Titanochelon. Remains from the Pleistocene of Malta were also considered possibly attributable to this genus. In 2022, "Testudo" gymnesica and the Maltese species were assigned to the new genus Solitudo.

Evolutionary history 
Phylogenetic analyses have recovered Titanochelon as most closely related to Stigmochelys (the leopard tortoise), which is native to Africa, suggesting the genus has an African origin. Fossils have been recovered from across Europe beginning in the Early Miocene from Portugal, Spain, France, Switzerland, Germany, Austria, the Czech Republic, Greece, Bulgaria, and Anatolia. The youngest known defintiive remains of the genus are known from the Early Pleistocene Fonelas P-1 site of Granada in southern Spain, dating to around 2.0 million years ago. Their extinction was likely related to climatic cooling due to the onset of glaciation at the beginning of the Pleistocene.

References 

Testudinidae
Taxa described in 2014
Prehistoric turtle genera